Kénadsa is a district in Béchar Province, Algeria. It was named after its capital, Kénadsa. According to the 2008 census, the total population of the district was 14,084 inhabitants. The district covers the area directly west of the province's capital, Béchar; the Oued Guir flows from north to south through the district, and is dammed at the  Djorf Torba dam.

Municipalities
The district is further divided into 2 communes:
Kénadsa
Méridja

References

Districts of Béchar Province